The 2017 American Athletic Conference men's soccer season was the 5th season of men's varsity soccer in the conference. The season began on August 25 and concluded on November 12, 2017.

Defending regular season champions, SMU, retained their title, and won the 2017 American Athletic Conference Men's Soccer Tournament. The Mustangs were the conference's sole berth in the NCAA Tournament, where they reached the round of 16. There, they lost to North Carolina.

Background

Head coaches

Preseason

Recruiting

Preseason poll

Preseason All-AAC Teams

Preseason All-AAC Team

Regular season

Rankings

Sources: TopDrawer Soccer, United Soccer Coaches

Postseason

AAC Tournament

NCAA Tournament

Records against other conferences

Awards

Regular season awards

Players of the Week

Postseason awards

All-AAC awards and teams

All-Americans

College Soccer News 
Three players in the conference were named All-Americans by CollegeSoccerNews.com.

 Mauro Cichero, SMU — 1st Team All-American
 Michael Nelson, SMU — 1st Team All-American
 Jordan Cano, SMU — 3rd Team All-American

United Soccer Coaches 

Three players in the conference were named All-Americans by United Soccer Coaches.

 Mauro Cichero, SMU — 1st Team All-American
 Jordan Cano, SMU — 3rd Team All-American
 Garrett McLaughlin, SMU — 3rd Team All-American

MLS SuperDraft 

Two players from the conference were selected in the 2018 MLS SuperDraft. This included Michael Nelson and Mauro Cichero, both of SMU.

Total picks by school

List of selections

Homegrown contracts

See also 
 2017 NCAA Division I men's soccer season
 2017 American Athletic Conference women's soccer season

References

External links 
 American Athletic Conference Men's Soccer

 
2017 NCAA Division I men's soccer season